Asson is a commune in the Pyrénées-Atlantiques department in the Nouvelle-Aquitaine region of south-western France.

The inhabitants of the commune are known as Assonais.

Geography
Asson is a large commune in the Ouzom Valley some 30 km south by south-east of Pau and 35 km east by south-east of Oloron-Sainte-Marie which almost completely surrounds the commune of Arthez-d'Asson. The south-eastern border of the commune is the border between the departments of Pyrenees-Atlantiques and Hautes-Pyrénées. Access to the commune is by the D 35 road from Igon in the east which passes through the village and continues west to Bruges-Capbis-Mifaget. The D 36 road comes from Nay in the north to join the D 35 just west of the village. The D 126 road goes south from the village to Arthez-d'Asson. The D 226 branches from the D 126 and goes east by a circuitous route to Lestelle-Betharram. The southern half of the commune is mountainous and heavily forested while the north is farmland with scattered small patches of forest.

The Pyrénées-Atlantiques Interurban Network of buses has a stop in the commune on route 810 from Lys to Pau

Hydrography 
The river Gave de Pau (Adour basin) and its tributaries the Ouzoum and the Béez flow through the commune.

The Ouzoum is fed in Asson by the Ruisseaux of Gerse, Turonnet, de Thouet, le Goulet, d'Incamps, de Berdoulat, and the Arrieucourt which forms the eastern border of the commune (itself fed by the Ruisseau de la Fontaine Béra), and the Hèche, Hau, and Gat.  Paul Raymond mentioned in the 1863 dictionary on p. 168 another tributary of the Ouzoum called le Touchet which rose in Asson and Arthez-d'Asson.

The Béez is joined in the commune by the Ruisseaux of Landistou, Trubés (itself fed by the Ruisseau de Marlies), Toupiette, Arrouy, Mourté, Lacot (joined in the commune by the Ruisseau de la Sègue), Jupé, Picas, Coudé, and Soulens.

Places and hamlets

 Arnaude
 Arrestouilh
 Arrioucourt
 Arrouaus
 Aubuchou
 Ausone
 Barrabourg
 Bascou
 Batailles
 Bélile
 Bellocq (Pass - 437 metres)
 Berdeu
 Berdoulat
 Berduc
 Bernadou
 Bernatas
 Betbeu
 Betcabe
 Betpède
 Bonnehon
 Bourdila
 Bourié
 Brau
 Brouquet
 Brune
 Busoc
 Cabalou
 Carache
 Cassagne
 Cassou
 Castella
 Castet Mauheit
 Castet-Oussès
 Catala
 Cayeré
 Cotbracq
 Cot de Hosse
 Les Courades
 La Courgue
 Les Crabes
 Crouseilles
 Dagues
 Donzelot
 Douasous
 Dourron
 Ermitage d'Asson
 Espagna (ruins)
 Espoune-Carbou
 Estradère
 Fradi
 Gabouil
 Galibet
 Le Garroc Blanc
 Gestou
 Gourgues (vale of)
 Grabot
 Gracié
 Guillamasse
 Herran
 Hourc
 Hourcségou
 Hourquet
 Labarrère (mill)
 Labat
 Labedays
 Labielle
 Lacoume
 Lalanne
 Lamothe
 Lanardonne
 Larban
 Larruhat
 Lartigue
 Lasque
 Latapie (bridge)
 Loustalot
 Luppé (château)
 Mandrou
 Mansiou
 Marcadet
 Massey
 Matocq
 Mesplé
 Milhet
 Monge
 Montguillalou
 Montguillet
 Jean Moulié
 Mounicou
 Nabarrà
 Naspret
 Nérios
 Nougué
 L’Oustau
 Pabine
 Palu
 Pédeprade
 Péré
 Peyrade
 Peyroutet
 Pladepousaux
 Pousaux
 Pradou
 Regourt
 Rouby
 Sanguinet
 Sanguinet (pass - 512 metres)
 Sarrailhé
 Sarraméda
 Sendou
 Teich (pass - 1034 metres)
 Teulère
 Thou
 Thouet
 Touyarou
 Trencade (pass - 1273 metres)

Neighbouring communes and villages

Toponymy
The commune name in béarnais is also Asson. Michel Grosclaude said that the name probably comes from the basque aitz/as ("rocky point") with the locative suffix -on, giving "place where there is a high point".

The following table details the origins of the commune name and other names in the commune.

Sources

Raymond: Topographic Dictionary of the Department of Basses-Pyrénées, 1863, on the page numbers indicated in the table. 
Grosclaude: Toponymic Dictionary of communes, Béarn, 2006 
Saint-Pé: Cartulary of the Abbey of Saint-Pé
Reformation: Reformation of Béarn
Lescar: Cartulary of Lescar
Census: Census of Béarn
Fors de Béarn
Intendance: Intendance of Pau
Cour Majour: Regulations of the Cour Majour
Notaries of Nay
Cassini: Cassini Map from 1750

History
Paul Raymond noted on p. 14 that before 1232 Asson was localised near the place called the Hermitage and that there was a Lay Abbey, vassal of the Viscounts of Béarn.

The village signed a Charter of Emancipation on 4 January 1282 with the consent of Gaston VII, Viscount of Béarn.

In 1385, Asson had 57 fires and depended on the bailiwick of Nay.

Asson came under the Notary of Nay as did Angaïs, Arros, Arthez-d'Asson, Baliros, Baudreix, Bénéjacq, Beuste, Boeil, Bordères, Bosdarros, Clarac, Coarraze, Igon, Lagos, Lestelle, Mirepeix, Montaut, Nay, Pardies, and Saint-Abit.

Administration

List of Successive Mayors

Inter-communality
The commune is part of five inter-communal structures:
 the Communauté de communes du Pays de Nay;
 the association for water and sanitation of Pays de Nay;
 the Energy association of Pyrénées-Atlantiques;
 the inter-communal association of Gave de Pau;
 the joint association for the basin of the Gave de Pau;

Demography
In 2017 the commune had 2,031 inhabitants.

Economy
The commune is part of the Appellation d'origine contrôlée (AOC) zone of Ossau-iraty and has protected geographical indications (PGI) namely: Tarbais haricots, Tomme des Pyrénées, Duck foie gras of the South-west, and Bayonne ham.

Culture and heritage
The local language is occitan-gascon, called locally béarnais. A bilingual class offers courses in béarnais in the commune school from kindergarten to CM2.

Civil heritage
There is a Metallic Glasshouse at Lalanne in the Asson zoo built in 1900.

The owners of the Château of Abère have been known since the 12th century.

Religious heritage

The Church of Saint-Martin, partially dating from the 15th century, contains a Triptych of the Crucifixion from the 16th century.

Asson is a stage on the Chemin du piémont pyrénéen (or el cami deu pé de la coste), a secondary itinerary on the Way of St. James.

Environmental heritage
The Bétharram Caves
The Grottes de Bétharram (Bétharram Caves) are a series of Caves located on the border between the departments of Pyrénées-Atlantiques and Hautes-Pyrénées.
Their extent cover some of the communes of Asson and Lestelle-Bétharram in Pyrénées-Atlantiques and Saint-Pé-de-Bigorre in Hautes-Pyrénées. They can be explored on foot, by boat, or by a small train.

Asson Zoo
Covering five hectares, Asson zoo displays a zoological collection composed of endangered or unusual species in zoos.

Mountains
The following mountain peaks are found in the commune:
The Castet-Ousset (718 metres)
The Soum de Camlong (881 metres)
The Céberi (891 metres)
The Soum d’Arangou (892 metres)
The Soum de la Bécole (947 metres)
The Pène de la Hèche (1,326 metres)
The Toupiettes (1,357 metres)
The Soum de Martî-Peyras (1,464 metres)
The Soume de Moulle (1,544 metres)
The Peak of Monbula (1,583 metres)

Facilities

Éducation
Asson has two primary schools (The école du Bourg and the école du Pont Latapie).

Sport
Sports in Asson revolve around the Ladies Handball Championship of France, National 3.

See also
Communes of the Pyrénées-Atlantiques department

External links
Asson commune website
Asson on Géoportail, National Geographic Institute (IGN) website 
Aßon on the 1750 Cassini Map

References

Communes of Pyrénées-Atlantiques